Gingrich is a surname. For its origin and history see its spelling variant Gingerich. Notable people with the name include:

 Andre Gingrich (born 1952) is an Austrian ethnologist and anthropologist
 Arnold Gingrich (1903–1976), American magazine editor
 Callista Gingrich (born 1966), American performance and production company president and wife of Newt Gingrich
 Candace Gingrich (born 1966), American activist
 F. Wilbur Gingrich (1901–1993), American biblical scholar
 John E. Gingrich (1897–1960), American United States Navy admiral
 Mauree Gingrich (born 1946), American politician
 Newt Gingrich (born 1943), American politician